Caenides otilia, the Otilia's recluse, is a species of butterfly in the family Hesperiidae. It is found in Sierra Leone, Ivory Coast, Ghana, Nigeria and southern Cameroon. The habitat consists of dense, dark forest.

References

Butterflies described in 1990
Hesperiinae